Parag Patel FRCS (born 27 December 1975) is a British sport shooter who works as an ear, nose and throat consultant at Kingston Hospital in London.

Patel competed for England in the Queen's prize pairs and individual events at the 2014 Commonwealth Games where he won a gold and bronze medal respectively. He had previously won two golds, a silver and a bronze in the full bore rifle events at the two preceding Commonwealth Games.

On 22 July 2017, Patel won the prestigious Gold Medal in the third stage of the Queen's Prize competition during the National Rifle Association's 148th Imperial Meeting, held at Bisley Camp in Surrey, England. Patel managed a rare double, also winning the Silver Medal for highest score in the short-range second stage.

Patel started shooting at Epsom College and his prodigious talent was in early evidence as he won the Canadian Grand Aggregate as an Atheling in 1994.

References

External links
 
 

1975 births
Living people
English male sport shooters
British male sport shooters
Commonwealth Games gold medallists for England
Commonwealth Games silver medallists for England
Commonwealth Games bronze medallists for England
Commonwealth Games medallists in shooting
Shooters at the 2006 Commonwealth Games
Shooters at the 2010 Commonwealth Games
Shooters at the 2014 Commonwealth Games
Shooters at the 2018 Commonwealth Games
Medallists at the 2006 Commonwealth Games
Medallists at the 2010 Commonwealth Games
Medallists at the 2014 Commonwealth Games
Medallists at the 2018 Commonwealth Games